Andrew Scott Sloan (June 12, 1820April 8, 1895) was an American lawyer, Republican politician, and Wisconsin pioneer.  He served one term in the U.S. House of Representatives and was Wisconsin's 11th Attorney General.  He also 14 years as a Wisconsin circuit court judge and was a three-term mayor of Beaver Dam, Wisconsin.  His brother, Ithamar Sloan, was also a U.S. congressman.

Biography

Born in Morrisville, New York, Sloan attended the public schools and Morrisville Academy. He married Angelina Mary Dodge in 1841 or 1843. He studied law and was admitted to the bar in 1842, commencing practice in Morrisville, New York. He served as clerk of the Madison County Court from 1847 to 1849.

In 1854, Sloan moved to Wisconsin, settling in Beaver Dam, Wisconsin, where he continued the practice of law. He served as member of the Wisconsin State Assembly in 1857, and as mayor of Beaver Dam in 1857, 1858, and again in 1879. In 1858, he was also appointed in 1858 as judge of the Wisconsin Circuit Court for the third district.

Sloan was elected as a Republican to the Thirty-seventh Congress (March 4, 1861 – March 3, 1863) as the representative of Wisconsin's 3rd congressional district. He was not a candidate for renomination in 1862, and afterwards resumed the practice of law. He was an unsuccessful candidate of the Union Party for election in 1864 to the Thirty-ninth Congress. He then served as clerk of the United States District Court for the District of Wisconsin from 1864 until 1866, and as judge of the Dodge County Court from 1868 to 1874. He was Attorney General of Wisconsin from 1874 to 1878, and served as judge of the circuit court for the thirteenth judicial district from January 1882 until his death.

He died of pneumonia in Beaver Dam at the age of 74, and was interred in Oakwood Cemetery. His son, Henry Clay Sloan, was also a member of the Wisconsin State Assembly.

Electoral history

U.S. House of Representatives (1860)

| colspan="6" style="text-align:center;background-color: #e9e9e9;"| General Election, November 6, 1860

U.S. House of Representatives (1864)

| colspan="6" style="text-align:center;background-color: #e9e9e9;"| General Election, November 8, 1864

Wisconsin Attorney General (1873, 1875)

| colspan="6" style="text-align:center;background-color: #e9e9e9;"| General Election, November 4, 1873

| colspan="6" style="text-align:center;background-color: #e9e9e9;"| General Election, November 2, 1875

References

External links

|-

|-

|-

1820 births
1895 deaths
Wisconsin Attorneys General
Wisconsin state court judges
Mayors of places in Wisconsin
Republican Party members of the Wisconsin State Assembly
Politicians from Beaver Dam, Wisconsin
New York (state) lawyers
Wisconsin lawyers
New York (state) Republicans
Republican Party members of the United States House of Representatives from Wisconsin
People from Morrisville, New York
19th-century American politicians
19th-century American judges
19th-century American lawyers